Ogilbichthys is a genus of viviparous brotulas found in the central-western Atlantic Ocean and the Caribbean Sea. he generic name refers to the resemblance of these fish to those in the genus Ogilbia, a name honours the Australian naturalist James Douglas Ogilby (1853-1925), combined with ichthys which means "fish" in Greek.

Species
There are currently seven recognized species in this genus:
 Ogilbichthys ferocis Møller, Schwarzhans & J. G. Nielsen, 2004 (Ferocious coralbrotula)
 Ogilbichthys haitiensis Møller, Schwarzhans & J. G. Nielsen, 2004 (Haiti coralbrotula)
 Ogilbichthys kakuki Møller, Schwarzhans & J. G. Nielsen, 2004 (Kakuk's coralbrotula)
 Ogilbichthys longimanus Møller, Schwarzhans & J. G. Nielsen, 2004 (Long-finned coralbrotula)
 Ogilbichthys microphthalmus Møller, Schwarzhans & J. G. Nielsen, 2004 (Small-eyed coralbrotula)
 Ogilbichthys puertoricoensis Møller, Schwarzhans & J. G. Nielsen, 2004 (Puerto Rican coralbrotula)
 Ogilbichthys tobagoensis Møller, Schwarzhans & J. G. Nielsen, 2004 (Tobagonian coralbrotula)

References

Bythitidae